Andrew McCollum (born September 4, 1983) is an American angel investor and businessman. McCollum is a co-founder of Facebook and current CEO of Philo.

Education
He attended Harvard University with co-founder Mark Zuckerberg and others on the founding team. He worked at Facebook from February 2004 to September 2007. Initially, he worked on Wirehog, a file sharing program, together with Adam D'Angelo. McCollum returned to Harvard College, and graduated in 2007 with a Bachelor's degree in Computer Science. He later earned a master's degree in education from the Harvard Graduate School of Education.

McCollum was a member of the Harvard team that competed in the 31st Association for Computing Machinery International Collegiate Programming Contest in Tokyo, having placed second in the regional competitions behind Massachusetts Institute of Technology.

Career
Andrew McCollum was the cofounder of JobSpice, an online resume preparation tool. He currently acts as Entrepreneur in Residence at New Enterprise Associates and Flybridge Capital Partners.

On November 20, 2014, McCollum was announced as new Philo CEO, succeeding Christopher Thorpe.

Personal life
McCollum is married to Gretchen Sisson.

References

External links
 Philo (TV Service)

Living people
Facebook employees
Harvard University alumni
1983 births
American chief executives
Harvard Graduate School of Education alumni